The Royal Order of St. Sava is an Order of merit, first awarded by the Kingdom of Serbia in 1883 and later by the Kingdom of Serbs, Croats and Slovenes, and the Kingdom of Yugoslavia. It was awarded to nationals and foreigners for meritorious achievements in the field of religion, education, science and the arts as well as for social and relief work. The order was abolished in 1945 with the proclamation of the People’s Federal Republic of Yugoslavia and the end of the monarchy.

It continues as a dynastic order, with appointments currently made by Alexander, Crown Prince of Yugoslavia.

An homonymous order was established in 1985, conferred by the Serbian Orthodox Church to ecclesiastic and secular persons with special merits.

History of the state order
The Order of Saint Sava was established by Milan I of Serbia, four years after the country gained independence and its transformation from a principality into a kingdom in March 1882. It was first awarded in January 1883 to recognised civilians for meritorious achievements benefitting the Church, the arts and sciences, the royal house, and the state. In 1914, a change to the Order was made to allow soldiers of the Serbian Army who served with distinction to receive the honour, as well as to women for war merit and humanity The Order of St. Sava was thereafter awarded by the kings of Serbia and its successor Yugoslavia until the abolition of the monarchy in 1945.

Five grades were awarded: 
 Knight Grand Cross
 Knight
 Grand Officer
 Commander
 Officer

The first grade was a jewel, worn with a sash over the shoulder and also with a breast star. The second and third-grade laureates wore the Order on a neckband. The fourth grade was a medal with a triangular suspension, a rosette attached to the ribbon above the medal. The fifth grade had a triangular suspension without a rosette. The medals of the fourth and fifth grades were worn on the breast. All white ribbons had two light blue stripes.

Several Order of St. Sava were bestowed to members of the British medical team during the First World War for "humanity and gallantry performed under fire", after their volunteer medical units followed the Serbian army during the Great Retreat through the mountains of Albania.

History of the church order
Since 1985, the Order has been awarded on the occasion of the 800th anniversary of St. Sava. This order is dedicated to ecclesiastic and secular persons, who have special merits for the Serbian Orthodox Church. According to the ordinance of the church, each person who received a medal of third grade may receive the medal of the higher grade as well as the first grade for future merits, provided that three years have passed at least since the previous award. The order is determined in three grades: the first one is white, the second red and the third blue coloured.

Laureates of the state

 Isaac Alcalay
 Xavier Arnozan, French physician, 1st Grade
 Agnes Bennett, New Zealand doctor
 Harry Woodburn Blaylock
William Cavendish-Bentinck, 6th Duke of Portland
Thomas Cook
Randall Davidson
William Hunter, 2nd Grade 1915
Mary E. Gladwin, English-born American Red Cross nurse
Helen Hanson, British doctor, 2nd grade
Queen Kapiolani of Hawaii, Hawaii 1883
Helen Keller, 3rd Grade 1931
Grand Duke Dmitry Konstantinovich of Russia
Dominik Mandić, Herzegovinian Franciscan
Dragoljub Mihailović, 25 January 1928
Milutin Milanković
Alojzije Mišić, 10 November 1923
Peter Norman Nissen
Nicholas Roerich, 1932
Marie of Romania
Jessie Scott, New Zealand doctor
Nikola Tesla, 2nd Grade 1892
Violetta Thurstan, English nurse, 1918
Đorđe Vajfert (I grade)
Dame Rebecca West, British author and journalist.

Laureates of the Church
Patriarch Alexy II, Patriarch of Moscow and all Russia
Novak Đoković, 2011
Aleksandr Karelin, 2013
Emir Kusturica
Patriarch Peter VII of Alexandria
Vladimir Putin
Alexander Isaevich Solzhenitsyn

Notes

References

St. Sava, Order of
Saint Sava, Order of
Awards established in 1883
Saint Sava
1883 establishments in Serbia
1985 establishments in Serbia
Serbian Orthodox Church
Eastern Orthodox ecclesiastical decorations
Orders, decorations, and medals of the Kingdom of Serbia